Frederich "Fritz" Kuhn (24 October 1919 – 8 January 2005) was a West German bobsledder who competed in the early 1950s. He won a gold medal in the four-man event at the 1952 Winter Olympics in Oslo.

References
Bobsleigh four-man Olympic medalists for 1924, 1932–56, and since 1964
DatabaseOlympics.com profile

1919 births
2005 deaths
Bobsledders at the 1952 Winter Olympics
German male bobsledders
Olympic medalists in bobsleigh
Medalists at the 1952 Winter Olympics
Olympic gold medalists for West Germany